Ivan Vladimirovich Vasiliev (born 9 January 1989) is a Russian ballet dancer and choreographer. He graduated from the Bielorussian Ballet School in 2006.

Early on, he won prizes that include First Prize and Best Dancer Prize at the Arabesque-96 Ballet Competition in Perm in 2005, First Prize at the Moscow International Ballet Competition in 2006, Special Distinction of the Varna International Ballet Competition in 2006, Rising Star of Soul of Dance Award in 2008, one of "25 to Watch" of Dance Magazine 2008,  Benois Prix de la Danse in 2009, Virtuosity Prize of International Dance Open in Saint Peterburg in 2010, followed by the Grand Prix the following year, Best Dancer of 2011 UK Critic's Award. In 2014 he was granted the title of "Honoured Artist of Russia". In 2015, by public poll, he was awarded Discovery of the Year QG Prize, for his first ballet evening as choreographer.

Career 

Vasiliev joined the Bolshoi Ballet in the end of 2006, as first soloist. When 2010 came to an end he had already performed the leading roles in Le Corsaire, Flames of Paris, Don Quixote, Giselle, La Fille Mal-Gardée, Spartacus, Petrouchka, The Nutcracker, La Esmeralda, La Bayadère and been promoted to the rank of principal of the Bolshoi Ballet; he was the last dancer to be coached by Roland Petit in the role of Le Jeune Homme, and had joined The Kings of The Dance international group of male dancer stars.

Vasiliev and Natalia Osipova, his then-fiancée, left the Bolshoi in the end of 2011, in the search for wider artistic horizons. They both became principals of the Mikhailovsky Theatre in Saint Petersburg, with plenty of freedom to perform worldwide as guests. Vasiliev became a regular guest principal at the  American Ballet Theatre, La Scala and the Bolshoi. He also performed leading roles in Mariinsky Theatre, Stanislavsky Theatre, Novosibirsk Theatre, English National Ballet, Bayrisches Staatsballet, and the Australian Ballet. The Kings of The Dance initiative brought him through many countries during 5 years. In 2015 he became regular principal also in the Novosibirsk Theatre.

Beginning in 2015, Vasiliev started to dedicate himself to choreography too. He staged an evening in the spring of 2015 with short pieces, an evening with three one-act ballets in the spring with 2016, and a full length Christmas ballet the following winter. In May 2016, one more one-act ballet was presented in the scope of Project for Young Choreographers in Bolshoi.

Repertoire

Full length ballets 

Don Quixote - Marius Petipa, in the versions by Alexei Fadeyechev, Mikhail Messerer and Rudolph Nurejev

Flames of Paris - Vasily Vainonen, in the versions by Alexei Ratmansky and Mikhail Messerer

Le Corsaire - Marius Petipa, in the versions of Alexey Ratmansky and Mikhail Messerer

La Bayadére - Marius Petipa, in 3 versions of Vakhtang Chabukiani, Natalia Makarova and Yuri Grigorovitch

Spartacus - Yuri Grigorovitch

Ivan The Terrible - Yuri Grigorovitch

The Prodigal Son - Georges Balanchine

The Sleeping Beauty - in the versions of Nacho Duato and Marius Petipa

Giselle - Marius Petipa and in the versions of Yuri Grigorovitch, Vladimir Vasiliev

The Nutcracker - Yuri Grigorovich

Lost Illusions - Alexey Ratmansky

La Fille Mal Gardé - Sir Frederick Ashton

Romeo and Juliet - in 3 versions, of Sir Kenneth MacMillan, Sir Frederick Ashton and Nacho Duato

The Bright Stream - Alexey Ratmansky

Coppelia - Marius Petipa, in 2 versions of Sergei Vikharev and Enrique Martinez

The Swan Lake - Marius Petipa, in versions of Derek Lane (Siegfried), Mikhail Messerer (Evil Sorcerer), Kevin MacKenzie (Rothbarth)

La Sylphide - James Bournounville

Laurencia - Vakhtang Chabukiani, version by Mikhail Messerer

Notre-Dame - Roland Petit

Cippollino - Genrikh Mayorov

A Christmas Carol - Ivan Vasiliev

One Act Ballets 

Class Concert

Halt de la Cavallerie

L'Arlesiénne

Le Jeune Homme et La Mort

Labyrinth of Solitude

Le Spectre de La Rose

For 4

Jazzy Five

Ko'D

Mercy

Passo

Facada

Mozart and Salieri

Petroushka

Sheherazade

Shostakovitch Piano Concert

Blind Affair

Morphine

Love is Everywhere

Natasha's First Ball

Independent short Ballets 

Rossini PDD

Serenata PDD

The Talisman PDD

Underwood

Kamarinskaya

The Skydivers

See also
 List of Russian ballet dancers

References

External links
https://web.archive.org/web/20110621234333/http://www.bolshoi.ru/en/theatre/ballet_troupe/soloists/index.php?act26=info&id26=842&id30=1584
http://www.ardani.com/projects-vasiliev.php
https://web.archive.org/web/20080905175742/http://www.ballet.co.uk/magazines/yr_07/aug07/interview_ivan_vasiliev.htm
http://www.telegraph.co.uk/culture/theatre/dance/7838728/Ivan-Vasiliev-rocket-man.html
http://www.independent.co.uk/arts-entertainment/theatre-dance/reviews/first-night-the-bolshoi-ballet-royal-opera-house-2030487.html

Living people
1989 births
Russian male ballet dancers
People from Vladivostok
Bolshoi Ballet principal dancers